In mathematics, a Riemann form in the theory of abelian varieties and modular forms, is the following data:

 A lattice Λ in a complex vector space Cg.
 An alternating bilinear form α from Λ to the integers satisfying the following Riemann bilinear relations:

 the real linear extension αR:Cg × Cg→R of α satisfies αR(iv, iw)=αR(v, w) for all (v, w) in Cg × Cg;
 the associated hermitian form H(v, w)=αR(iv, w) + iαR(v, w) is positive-definite.

(The hermitian form written here is linear in the first variable.)

Riemann forms are important because of the following:

 The alternatization of the Chern class of any factor of automorphy is a Riemann form.
 Conversely, given any Riemann form, we can construct a factor of automorphy such that the alternatization of its Chern class is the given Riemann form.

References

 
 
 

Abelian varieties
Bernhard Riemann